Vitaly Konstantinov (born 1949) is a Russian wrestler. He was Olympic gold medalist in Greco-Roman wrestling in 1976, competing for the Soviet Union. He won a gold medal at the 1975 World Wrestling Championships.

References

1949 births
Living people
Soviet male sport wrestlers
Olympic wrestlers of the Soviet Union
Wrestlers at the 1972 Summer Olympics
Wrestlers at the 1976 Summer Olympics
Russian male sport wrestlers
Olympic gold medalists for the Soviet Union
Olympic medalists in wrestling
Medalists at the 1976 Summer Olympics